How Much for Happy is Canadian actress and singer-songwriter Cassie Steele's debut album. How Much for Happy was released in Canada on March 15, 2005, and in the US on April 26, 2005. The album was sold on iTunes in the US for a few months, but after having an argument with Rob'N'Steal Productions about the distribution of How Much for Happy, the album was removed from iTunes, yet was still available on Amazon.com. Physically, the album is now out of print in the US, but it was put back on iTunes. Steele wrote 12 out of the 13 tracks on her debut album. The thirteenth was a remake of the popular song by Jimi Hendrix, "Hey Joe".

Sales
The album was certified gold in Canada, selling more than 25,000 copies.

Singles
Two singles, "Blue Bird" and "Famous", were released off of the album. A music video for "Blue Bird" was released as well, which featured Cassie recording the single along with photos of her.

Track listing
"Not Yours Truly"
"Famous"
"Fantasy"
"Blue Bird"
"Jaded"
"Rock Your Bones"
"Drink Me Dry"
"Crimson Tears"
"Broken (How Much for Happy)"
"Empty Eyes"
"A Sinner's Prayer"
"Love Cost"
"Hey Joe"
 Unreleased track: "Things That God Cannot Explain"

2005 debut albums
Cassie Steele albums